Tetragrammatical Astygmata is the third (fifth, counting live records) full-length studio release from the Austin-based black metal band Averse Sefira.  It was the last of their albums to be released on an independent metal label; in 2006, the band would jump to Candlelight and release their label debut in 2008.  Much like that disc, this is split into categories; tracks 1-3 are "Blood", tracks 4 & 5 are "Flesh", tracks 6 & 7 are "Death", and tracks 8-10 are "Earth".

Track Listing
All Songs Written & Arranged By Averse Sefira.

"Exordium" 0:41
"Detonation" 5:31
"Cremation of Ideologies" 5:50
"Hierpphant Disgorging" 5:18
"Plagabraha" 3:10
"Helix In Audience" 8:13
"Mana Anima" 6:32
"Decapitation of Sigils" 4:53
"Transitive Annihilation" 5:06
"Sonance Inumberate" 5:16

Personnel

Averse Sefira
Sanguine Mapsama: Guitars, Vocal
Lady Of The Evening Faces: Keyboards, Interludes & Effects
Wrath Satahriel Diablous: Bass, Vocal Backing
The Carcass: Drums, Percussion

Additional Personnel
Tore "Necromorbus" Stjerna: Additional Vocals on "Detonation" & "Sonance Inumberate"

Production
Arranged By Averse Sefira.
Produced, Recorded, Mixed & Mastered By Tore Stjerna

References

2005 albums
Averse Sefira albums
Candlelight Records albums